The Isle of Thanet Rural District was a rural district covering part of the Isle of Thanet in the county of Kent, England, from 1894 to 1935. Most of its former area is now part of the Thanet district.

When the district was created several ancient parishes were split to create urban and rural parts. Northdown was created from the part of Margate St John the Baptist that was outside the Municipal Borough of Margate, St Lawrence Extra was created from the part of St Lawrence that was outside the Municipal Borough of Ramsgate. St Peter Extra was created from the part of St Peter's that was not part of Broadstairs and St Peter's Urban District.

It included the following civil parishes:

The rural district was abolished in 1935 by the County of Kent Review Order, 1935.

References

Districts of England created by the Local Government Act 1894
History of Kent
Thanet
Rural districts of England